Ak Toba is the name of a village and settlement in Afghanistan on the Kunduz River, 3 miles upstream of Kunda Guzar and about 32 miles southwest of Hazrat-i-Imam. The resident population of 50 families was, as of the beginning of the 20th century, largely Turkish.

See also
 Kunduz Province

References

Populated places in Kunduz Province
Villages in Afghanistan